Taco Pozo  is a village and municipality in Chaco Province in northern Argentina.

Local celebrations
 Santa Rosa de Lima, August 30 (employee holiday).
 Anniversary of the locality, December 2.

References

Populated places in Chaco Province